The 2012 Bolivian women's football championship was the eighth edition of the tournament. It was held from 22 to 26 October 2012 in the city of Santa Cruz. It was contested by seven regional champions and determined the 2012 Bolivian women's football champion and served as qualification to the continental championship, the 2012 Copa Libertadores Femenina.

Santa Cruz FC, who competed last year under then name Gerimex FC,  were the defending champions. For the eighth time the title went to a team from Santa Cruz when Universidad de Santa Cruz (Universidad Autónoma Gabriel René Moreno, UAGRM) won its title.

Format
Seven teams were divided into two groups of four and three teams. After all teams played each other once the two best placed teams per group moved onto the semi-finals.

Group stage

Group A

Day 1: 
Aurora 4–2 Estudiantes
Santa Cruz 5–0 Valencia JV

Day 2:
Aurora 4–0 Valencia JV
Santa Cruz 4–1 Estudiantes

Day 3:
Santa Cruz 3–0 FC Aurora
Estudiantes 4–0 Valencia JV

Group B

Day 1:
Universidad 2–0 Deportivo Chuquisaca

Day 2:
San Martín 2–0 Deportivo Chuquisaca

Day 3:
Universidad 2–1 San Martín

Knock-out stage

Semi-finals
The semi-finals were played the next day after the last group matches.

Third place match

Final

Top scorer
Santa Cruz FC's Luciel Pérez won the top-scorer award with her sixth goal in the final. Her teammate Maitté Zamorano scored five goals.

References

2012 in South American football leagues
Women